Josef Vacenovský (born 9 July 1937) is a Czech football forward who played for Czechoslovakia in the 1960 European Nations' Cup. He also played for Dukla Prague.

References

 Profile at the ČMFS website

1935 births
Czech footballers
Czechoslovak footballers
Czechoslovakia international footballers
Association football forwards
Dukla Prague footballers
1960 European Nations' Cup players
Living people
K.S.C. Lokeren Oost-Vlaanderen players
People from Hodonín District
Sportspeople from the South Moravian Region